Boni Haruna (born 12 June, 1957) is the former Nigerian Minister for Youth Development. He was governor of Adamawa State in Nigeria from 29 May 1999 to 29 May 2007. He was a member of the ruling People's Democratic Party (PDP).

Background

Boni Haruna was born on 12 June 1957. He studied Political Science at Ahmadu Bello University, Zaria.

Governor of Adamawa State

Boni Haruna was elected Adamawa state governor in April 1999, and reelected in April 2003. The 2003 result was contested by the All Nigeria Peoples Party (ANPP), which claimed massive electoral fraud. An electoral tribunal declared the election invalid.
However, an appeal court upturned the judgement of the Tribunal and reinstated Haruna.

In March 2006, Boni Haruna spoke against a third term for president Olusegun Obasanjo, saying most of the pro-third term governors were supporting it because they had something to hide.
He repeated his opposition during an April 2006 meeting of 20 state governors.

In September 2006, Governor Ahmed Yerima of Zamfara State, Boni Haruna of Adamawa, and other senior politicians joined United States Ambassador John Campbell to cut the ribbon launching full Visa Services at the U.S. Embassy in Abuja. 
The same month, the Chairman of the Economic and Financial Crimes Commission (EFCC), Mallam Nuhu Ribadu, said that Boni Haruna was among 31 state governors under investigation by the commission.
In February 2007, the Adamawa State House of Assembly served Boni Haruna with an impeachment notice for alleged gross misconduct and for inability to perform the functions of office as demanded by the 1999 constitution.

Subsequent career

Shortly before the April 2007 national elections, Haruna switched allegiance to the newly formed Action Congress (AC) party.
In April 2009, Boni Haruna said that he was dropping support for former Vice-President Atiku Abubakar, due to Atiku's failure to listen to advice from his associates.
The split may have been due to Haruna's decision to return to the Peoples Democratic Party, PDP, while Atiku was still remaining with the Action Congress.

In August 2008, he was arrested by the Economic and Financial Crimes Commission headed by Farida Waziri over allegations of corruption while serving as governor of the State between 1999 and 2007. His application for bail was refused.
In November 2008, an Abuja Federal High Court granted Haruna leave to travel to the United States for medical treatment, adjourning the case until February 2009 for the accused to take a fresh plea following the EFCC's amended charges.

In May 2009, Boni Haruna was re-arraigned by the Federal Government over alleged money laundering involving N100 million, after the discovery of new evidence related to his period in office as the governor of Adamawa State.
In August 2009, the Economic and Financial Crimes Commission (EFCC) brought a 28-count charge against Boni Haruna for forgery and illegal movement of about N150m to an unknown destination.
In October 2009, the EFCC filed 28 amended charges against Boni Haruna and three others.
In November 2009, the EFCC opposed an application by Haruna to again obtain travel documents for medical treatment in the United States.

Haruna competed in the 9 April, 2011 election for the Adamawa North Senatorial district on the Action Congress of Nigeria (ACN) platform. Bindo Jibrilla (PDP) defeated him, polling 75,112 votes to Haruna's 70,890 votes. The Congress for Progressive Change (CPC) candidate, Abba Mohammed, scored 22,866.

References

Living people
1957 births
Nigerian Christians
Governors of Adamawa State
Peoples Democratic Party state governors of Nigeria
Action Congress of Nigeria politicians